The  is a large wooden stadium in Ōdate, Akita, in northern Japan. The stadium covers an area of 12,915 m2. It was completed in June 1997 and is made from 25,000 Akita cypress trees which are covered with a special double Teflon-coated membrane. This allows enough sunlight into the stadium so that during the day no artificial lights are needed. The stadium is principally used for baseball games, but thanks in part to its removable grandstands, the stadium can also be used for other sports and events.
Nipro, a Japanese medical equipment manufacturing company, purchased the naming rights to the dome in 2017.

Structure 

The roof was made from 25,000 Akita cypress trees which were aged over the course of 60 years. This wooden framework is covered with a special double Teflon-coated membrane made from translucent fluorethylene resin-coated fibreglass. This membrane is very strong and light. Because of this, the dome itself also has an aerodynamic design to resist strong winds and heavy snowfall. Buildup of snow on the roof is prevented by circulating warm air between the two Teflon-coated membranes; this shakes off the snow and allows the stadium to be used in all weather.

Statistics 
 Area: 12,915 m2
 Total floor area: 24,672 m2
 Height: 
 Ceiling clearance:

Entertainment events
B'z – July 20, 1999 
TRF – August 15, 1998 
Kinki Kids – August 9–10, 2000 
SMAP – July 24, 1999, November 3, 2000
Morning Musume – November 24, 2002

Sports events
USA VS Japan Collegiate All-Star Series – June 27, 2001 
Master League baseball games

References

External links

  

Sports venues in Akita Prefecture
Covered stadiums in Japan
Baseball venues in Japan
Blaublitz Akita
Sports venues completed in 1997
1997 establishments in Japan
Ōdate